Emily Forbes is a British entrepreneur. She founded Seenit in 2014, an app to encourage collaboration. Forbes worked in film production at Working Title Films.

Early life and education 
Forbes attended Chelsea College of Arts, where she studied film. Her father, David Forbes, is a director at Savills. She went on to study visual communication.

Career 
Forbes worked on production of feature films for five years at Working Title Films. She was working as a documentary maker in South Africa when she had the idea to create an app to encourage collaboration in filmmaking. In 2014, Forbes founded Seenit, an app that allows users to collaboratively create content with colleagues, usable only by invitation. She received support from BBC Lab UK and Rupert Hambro as well as £40,000 from Creative England.

Forbes is outspoken about the challenges that women entrepreneurs face. She took part in the Mayor of London's SVC2UK (Silicon Valley Comes to UK), which included a trade mission of women founders to Silicon Valley.

Awards
Forbes has won the TechCrunch Disrupt award as well as Forbes 30 Under 30 in 2016.

References 

British women company founders
British chief executives
British graphic designers
Women graphic designers
British technology company founders
Alumni of Chelsea College of Arts
Living people
Nationality missing
Year of birth uncertain
1980s births
Place of birth missing (living people)
Date of birth missing (living people)
Women business executives